The 1974 United Bank Classic, also known as the Denver WCT, was a men's tennis tournament played on indoor carpet courts in Denver, Colorado in the United States that was part of the 1974 World Championship Tennis circuit. It was the third edition of the tournament and took place from April 22 through April 28, 1974. Sixth-seeded Roscoe Tanner won the singles competition.

Finals

Singles
 Roscoe Tanner defeated  Arthur Ashe 6–2, 6–4
 It was Tanner's first singles title of his career.

Doubles
 Arthur Ashe /  Roscoe Tanner defeated  Mark Cox /  Jun Kamiwazumi 6–3, 7–6

See also
 1974 Virginia Slims of Denver

References

External links
 ITF tournament edition details

United Bank Classic
Indoor tennis tournaments
United Bank Classic
United Bank Classic
United Bank Classic